The Mottone di Cava is a mountain of the Swiss Lepontine Alps, located east of Biasca in the canton of Ticino. It is located east of Pizzo Magn and west of the Forcarella di Lago.

References

External links
 Mottone di Cava on Hikr

Mountains of the Alps
Mountains of Switzerland
Mountains of Ticino
Lepontine Alps